The Fabric of Verse is the first Independent album by Christian Contemporary-Folk musician Bebo Norman. The album was his debut and his only album released through Anchor Records prior to his work with Watershed Records. This album was released in 1996 and was produced by Ed Cash.

Track listing

References

1996 albums
Bebo Norman albums